The 2020–21 ABA League First Division was the 20th season of the ABA League with 14 teams from Bosnia and Herzegovina, Croatia, Montenegro, Serbia and Slovenia participating in it. The season has started on 2 October 2020. 

The season is the first to be played after the previous season was abandoned due to the COVID-19 pandemic. The ABA League Assembly ruled that the 12 teams from the previous season stays in the league and the first two clubs from Second Division were awarded two wild cards.

The Slovenian club Koper Primorska was disqualified from the competition in December 2020 and forfeited 0–20 for all games. Defending champions Crvena zvezda mts won its fifth title following a 3–2 win over Budućnost VOLI in the 2021 Finals.

Teams

Promotion and relegation
A total of 14 teams will contest the league, including all 12 sides from the previous season and two clubs with wild cards from the 2019–20 Second Division season. Two wild cards were awarded to Borac Čačak and Split, two highest-placed teams.

In season disqualification 
The Slovenian club Koper Primorska was disqualified from the competition on 17 December 2020. Following this disqualification the league remain with 13 clubs for the rest of season.

Venues and locations

Personnel and sponsorship

Coaching changes

Regular season 
The regular season began on 2 October 2020.

On 17 December 2020, the Slovenian club Koper Primorska was disqualified from the competition after failing to play two consecutive games due to financial problems. All of the Koper Primorska results were be registered with the scores of 20–0 for their opponents and were not awarded a point for the defeat.

League table

Positions by round
The Slovenaian club Koper Primorska was disqualified from the competition on 17 December 2020.

Results
The Slovenaian club Koper Primorska was disqualified from the competition on 17 December 2020 and forfeited 0–20 for all matches before and following ejection. The club played nine games before ejection. They have not appeared in rounds 10 and 11. The club was disqualified from the further competition due to unjustified non-appearance in two consecutive games.

Results by round
The table lists the results of teams in each round.
The Slovenaian club Koper Primorska was disqualified from the competition on 17 December 2020 and forfeited 0–20 for all matches before and following ejection.

Playoffs

The semi-finals will be played in a best-of-three format, while the Finals were played in a best-of-five format.

Semifinals

Finals

Relegation playoffs 
The 13th placed team of the First Division season and the runners-up of the Second Division season will play in the Qualifiers for a spot in the next First Division season.

Results 

|}

Statistical leaders

All players statistics from the nine games with Koper Primorska were annulled following their disqualification from the competition.

| width=50% valign=top |

Points

 

|}

|}

| width=50% valign=top |

Assists

  

 
|}

|}Source: ABA League

Awards

MVP List

MVP of the Round

Source: ABA League

MVP of the Month

Clubs in European competitions

See also 
 List of current ABA League First Division team rosters
 2020–21 ABA League Second Division
 2020–21 Junior ABA League
 2020–21 WABA League

2020–21 domestic competitions
  2020–21 Basketball Championship of Bosnia and Herzegovina
  2020–21 HT Premijer liga
  2020–21 Prva A liga
  2020–21 Basketball League of Serbia
  2020–21 Slovenian Basketball League

Teams
 2020–21 KK Cedevita Olimpija season
 2020–21 KK Crvena zvezda season
 2020–21 KK Partizan season

Notes

References 

 
2020-21
Adriatic 1
2020–21 in Serbian basketball
2020–21 in Slovenian basketball
2020–21 in Croatian basketball
2020–21 in Bosnia and Herzegovina basketball
2020–21 in Montenegrin basketball